Parviturboides is a genus of gastropods belonging to the family Tornidae.

The species of this genus are found in America.

Species:

Parviturboides avitus 
Parviturboides clausus 
Parviturboides copiosus 
Parviturboides decussatus 
Parviturboides germanus 
Parviturboides habrotima 
Parviturboides interruptus 
Parviturboides monile 
Parviturboides monilifer

References

Tornidae